Sima Nan (born 22 June 1956), real name Yu Li, is a Chinese television pundit, social commentator, and journalist. In the early 21st century, he is well known for his staunch support of Chinese Communist Party stances and nationalistic, anti-American sentiments. In the late 1990s, he was mostly known for his criticism of pseudoscience and supernatural phenomena, especially his opposition to what he called Qigong-related fraud.

Biography 
Sima was born son of a traditional Chinese medicine doctor, in Heilongjiang province, although Shandong is considered his ancestral home. He graduated from Heilongjiang College of Business at the end of 1981, after which he was assigned to work for the central government in Beijing. He had worked a variety of jobs since, notably as a journalist and television producer. He is a member of the Communist Party of China.

Filmography

Television

Publications

Views and activism

As a political commentator 

The Wall Street Journal describes Sima as "one of China's most divisive advocates of neo-Maoist ideology", whereas Reuters characterized him as "Communist Party defender". Sima has been described as a Chinese New Left, and is among the best-known advocates of ousted political leader Bo Xilai's "Chongqing Model". Online, Chinese netizens consider him an "anti-America warrior", as a typical entry on Sima's microblog reads: “America is the enemy of all the people in the world... It’s like a giant tumor. Its military bases are all around the world. All wars after World War II were instigated, engineered or started by America...”

In 2011, Sima was invited by the North Korean government to attend the 100th Anniversary of Kim Il-sung's birth. After viewing the military parade, Sima enthused: " Not only should North Koreans love Kim Jong Un, people from every nation should love their leaders."

Bo's top lieutenant, Wang Lijun, was an admirer of Sima. In June 2011, Wang invited Sima to give a lecture on "ideological media voice" to 1800 policemen in Chongqing. During their meeting, Wang claimed he read Sima's writings "everyday".

During the Xi Jinping Administration, Sima's radical views place him the mainstream of Chinese politics.

His Weibo channel spread the notion that Jews colluded with the Japanese to establish a Jewish homeland on Chinese territory during the Second Sino-Japanese War.

In August 2022, he admitted to buying a house in California. This made him a target of widespread ridicule, with commentators saying "being anti-American is work, living in America is life". For unknown reasons, he was blocked in Chinese social media in August 2022. His accounts were later reinstated on August 27.

War on liberal Western ideas
In 2008, Sima waged an Internet war against Chinese commentators and intellectuals he says have hijacked this year's national dramas to undermine Communist Party rule and patriotic values. He targeted two of the nation's most widely read and combative newspapers, Southern Weekend and Southern Metropolis Daily, accusing them of promoting "Westernization" and liberal beliefs. He also accused the paper of writing favorably of Amnesty International and other groups critical of the Beijing Olympics and China's authoritarian government.

In September 2008, following the Beijing Olympics, Sima was interviewed by the BBC, and defended Chinese censorship regulations and the media firewall on Falun Gong in mainland China. Sima said that the group disseminates material that is blatantly "anti-China" in nature and that the Chinese public has long grown irritated with "Falun Gong rhetoric." In another interview with The Daily Telegraph, Sima says that China is not ready for personal freedom, nor suited to one man, one vote. Liberals, he claims, want to do away with "Chineseness" and turn the country into a pale imitation of the West. After Charter 08 came out, Sima wrote on his blog that the charter was a dangerous attempt to promote a Chinese "color revolution", referring to pro-democracy movements in Ukraine and Georgia.

In April 2011, days after Ai Weiwei was arrested by the Chinese government, Sima attended a web show denouncing him. Sima claimed that Ai's fame was due to his anti-China stance, and Ai received foreign funding to subvert China. Sima warned that if "Ai had his way, China will be worse". Upon learning Sima's accusations, Ai's mother challenged Sima to show evidence backing his claims.

Incidents
On 20 January 2012, Sima boarded a plane to Washington, DC, United States. At some point after arriving at Dulles International Airport, Sima leaned over the handrail of an escalator and got his head stuck between the rail and an approaching section of wall. He was rushed to hospital and received prompt treatment. The fact that a pundit who made a career out of bashing the United States quietly traveled there on the eve of Chinese New Year invited suspicions of hypocrisy and a deluge of ridicule on Chinese social networking sites. It was rumored Sima was in the U.S. to visit his wife and child living there, to which Sima did not deny, but emphasized privacy.

In October 2012, when giving a lecture at Hainan University, Sima Nan had a shoe thrown at him by a student. The episode occurred during the Q & A period. Arguing that Sima's Maoist views were a threat to freedom, the student quoted Socrates before hurling his sneaker to Sima, to the cheers of a packed auditorium.

As a skeptic

Qigong
Sima studied qigong while at college. His biography published in the Skeptical Inquirer states that he was influenced by the book Human Body Science by China's leading physicist Qian Xuesen. As a result, he became involved in the Chinese Human Body Science Association, through which he had an opportunity to witness demonstrations of the prominent masters of the time, for whom he used to run errands. Sima says this included transferring title of property the masters received from grateful followers. By 1990, he says he became disillusioned with the deception practiced by the qigong masters he had come into contact with, and found that the Qigong Science Research Association had little to do with serious research but was in fact interested in gaining influence and financial reward. Later, however, he was denounced as a "traitor" and expelled from the Human Body Science Association.

Sima says that the government had been harassing him until 1999, when the official policy on qigong underwent a reversal. Sima says he is motivated only by the satisfaction of unmasking cheats who he says prey on uneducated Chinese. His Skeptics biography alleged that, during the golden decade of qigong, the qigong network had sought to influence the highest level of the country's leadership. Governmental departments set up qigong research and development units and invested large sums of money for that purpose; people of all socioeconomic levels were deceived, in his view.

Falun Gong

According to Wall Street Journal'''s Ian Johnson, Sima was an obscure debunker of charlatans who shot to stardom following the state's 1999 crackdown on Falun Gong. In the six weeks since the Communist Party banned the spiritual practice, Mr. Sima became a hot commodity, "jetting around the country at the behest of party bosses who hope the self-styled cultbuster can root out believers". He was even given a national "hero of atheism" award.

Demand for Sima's consulting services increased following the ban of Falun Gong; He traveled around the country to give lectures. Sima said that although he supported the government's ban on Falun Gong, he was ambivalent about the government's vitriolic campaign against the practice and the hundreds of arrests. In 2000, The Globe and Mail'' reported that Sima had been asked by the Canadian government to assist them in combating illegal immigration from China: faced with many boat people arriving on Canada's west coast from China who claim persecution as members of Falun Gong in order to gain refugee status, the Canadians are hoping for help in assessing the applications.

Supernatural phenomena
Sima referred to ufologists as "romantics", saying that those who alleged to have seen UFOs or have had extraterrestrial encounters, all lack hard evidence to prove their claims via objective and scientific methods.

Association with others
Sima Nan is a friend of Fang Zhouzi. In 2006, Sima Nan, He Zuoxiu, Yuan Zhong and Guo Zhengyi established "Anti-Fraud Trust", soliciting donations from the public. The express purpose of the trust was to fund Fang Zhouzi's activities.

See also 
 He Zuoxiu
 Kong Qingdong

References

Further reading 
 
  translation

External links 
 Sima Nan's official Weibo (a Twitter-like service) 
 Sima Nan's official blog 
 "Sima Nan, where are you?"  歌曲: 司马南，你在哪里？song on V.QQ.com, accessed 26 January 2015

People's Republic of China journalists
Skeptics
1956 births
Living people
Chinese New Left
Chinese bloggers
Writers from Heilongjiang
Anti-Americanism
Critics of Falun Gong
Chinese communists
Chinese nationalists
Chinese atheism activists
20th-century atheists
21st-century atheists
Chinese Marxists